Isidor Pavlovich Natanson (February 8, 1906 in Zurich – July 3, 1964 in Leningrad) was a Swiss-born Soviet mathematician known for contributions to real analysis and constructive function theory, in particular, for his textbooks on these subjects. His son, Garal'd Natanson (1930–2003), was also a known mathematician.

Selected publications

References

External links
 
 

Mathematical analysts
Approximation theorists
1906 births
1964 deaths
Soviet mathematicians
20th-century Russian mathematicians
Swiss emigrants to the Soviet Union